"Stop Whispering" is a US only single by the English alternative rock band Radiohead, released in October 1993. It is an alternative recording to the track on their debut album,  Pablo Honey (1993). It reached #23 on the US Modern Rock Tracks chart in October 1993.

The track was later released as the follow-up to "Creep" in Australia on 7 February 1994. It peaked at #131 on the Australian ARIA singles chart.

Recording
Radiohead recorded various demos of "Stop Whispering" while they were an unsigned band in Abingdgon, Oxfordshire. One version impressed the owner of another local studio, Chris Hufford, who became Radiohead's co-manager with his partner Bryce Edge. The band recorded it for their first album, Pablo Honey (1993). According to co-producer Paul Kolderie, “We tinkered with it a bit. It was kind of a sprawling thing and we weren't sure how long it would be." 

Radiohead re-recorded "Stop Whispering" for the US single, as they were not happy with the album version; guitarist Ed O'Brien said the new version was "more atmospheric", like a Joy Division record.

Release 
"Stop Whispering" was the third single released from Pablo Honey. It was unsuccessful. Jimmy Eat World covered the song on their EP Damage.

Track listing
"Stop Whispering" (US version) – 4:11
"Creep" (acoustic) – 4:19
"Pop Is Dead" – 2:12
"Inside My Head" (live) – 2:58

Note: The US version was remixed by Chris Sheldon and featured strings and a slower tempo than the original.

Personnel
Radiohead
Thom Yorke – lead vocals, rhythm guitar
Colin Greenwood – bass guitar
Jonny Greenwood – lead guitar, organ
Ed O'Brien – rhythm guitar, backing vocals
Philip Selway – drums

Chart performance

References

External links

Stop Whispering Lyrics on MTV.com

1995 singles
Radiohead songs
Parlophone singles
Songs written by Thom Yorke
Songs written by Colin Greenwood
Songs written by Jonny Greenwood
Songs written by Philip Selway
Songs written by Ed O'Brien
1993 songs